The 2009 Kiribati ferry accident was the sinking, on 13 July 2009, of an inter-island ferry in the south Pacific nation of Kiribati. The accident is believed to have killed 33 of the ship's 55 passengers and crew.

The ferry was a  double-hulled wood catamaran en route between Tarawa and the outlying island of Maiana. It capsized when the captain attempted to turn around to rescue a crew member who had been swept overboard in high seas.  The Royal New Zealand Air Force sent a C130 aircraft to aid in air-sea rescue and recovery operations; it aided in recovering twenty survivors, and seven bodies, before calling off the search.  A further eighteen bodies were not recovered.

See also
MV Princess Ashika, a ferry which capsized in Tonga a month later
List of maritime disasters
, an I-Kiribati ferry travelling between Nonouti and Betio which sank in January 2018.

References

NZ quits search for 18 missing from Kiribati ferry (Archived 2009-08-11)

2009 in Kiribati
Maritime incidents in 2009
Maritime incidents in Kiribati
July 2009 events in Oceania